Tasha Scott is an American actress and singer.

Scott acted in several productions in the 1980s and 1990s. She appeared in a number of television shows, including Snoops, South Central and The Parent 'Hood, and in movies such as Troop Beverly Hills, Kiss Shot and Camp Cucamonga. She also played the role of Dorothy in the US national tour of the musical The Wiz from 1996 to 1997.
She also played Effy in Season 3, Episode 12 of Quantum Leap.

References

External links 
 

American film actresses
American television actresses
African-American actresses
20th-century American actresses
Living people
Year of birth missing (living people)
20th-century African-American women
20th-century African-American people
21st-century African-American people
21st-century African-American women